

L

 
 
 
 
 
 
 
 
 
 
 
 
 
 
 
  (1856)
 
 
 
 
 
  (/)
 

Lab–Lak

 
 
 
 
 
 
 
 
 
 
 
 
 
 
 
 
 
  (/)
 
 
 
 
 
 
 
 
 
 
 
 
 
 
 
 
 
 
 
 
 
 
 
 
 
 
 
 
 
 
 
 
 
 
 
 
 
 
 
 
 
 
 
 
 
 
 
 
 
 
 
 
 
 
 
 
  
  
 
 
 
 
 
 
 
 
 
 
 
 
 
 
 
 
  (//)
 
 
 

Lam–Lc

  (/)
  (//)
  (/)
 
 
 
 
 
 
  (/)
  (/)
  (/)
  (/)
 
 
  (//)
 
  (/)
 
  (//)
 
 
  (/, /)
 
  (/)
  (/)
 
 
 
  (//, /)
 
 
 
 
 
 
 
 
  (/)
 
 
  (1915)
 
 Laurent Millaudon (1856)
  (/)
 
 
 
 
 
  (/)
 
 
 
 
 
 
  
 List of LCIs (LCI(L)-1 to LCI(L)-1139)
 

Le

 
  (/)
  (/)
  (/)
  (/)
 
 
 
  (/)
 
 
  (1843)
 
 
 
 
  (/)
 
 
 
 
 
 
 
 
  (/)
 
  (/)
 
 
 
 
 
 
 
 
 
 
 
 
 
 
 
 
  (1837, 1864)
 
 
 
 
 
 
 
 
  (/, ////)
 
 
  (///)
 

Li–Ll

  (/)
 
  (/, /)
 
 
  (//)
  (/)
 
 
 
 
 
 
 
 
 
 
 
  (/)
  (/)
 
 
 
  (//)
 
  (//)
  (//)
 
 
  (/, /)
 
 
 
  (/)
  (///)
 
 
  (/)
 
  (/)
 
 
 
 
 
 
  (//)
 
 
 
 USNS Littlehales
 
 
  (/)
 
  (/)
 
  (/)

Lo

  (/)
  (/)
  (/)
 
 
 
 
  (/)
 
  (/)
 
 
 
  (/)
  (/)
  (/, /, //)
  (//)
 
  (/)
 
  (//)
  (/)
 
 
  (/)
 
 
 
 
  (1889)
 
 
 
 
  (1861)
 
 
  (/)
 
 
  (//)
 
  (/)
 
  (/)
 
  (/)

Ls–Ly
 List of LSMs (LSM-1 through LSM-558, including all LSM(R)s)
 List of LSTs (LST-1 through LST-1070)

 
  (//)
 
 
 
 
 
 
 
  (/, //)
 
 
  (/)
 
 
 
 
  (/)
 
  (/)
 
 
  (//)
 
 
 
 
 
  (/)
 
 
 
 
  (/)
 
 
 
 
 
  (/)
 
 
 
 
 
 
 
 
 

References

Primary
 Dictionary of American Naval Fighting Ships, L
  Naval Vessel Register, K

Secondary
 navy.mil: List of homeports and their ships
NavSource Naval History